Fibulia is a genus of sponges belonging to the family Dendoricellidae. The species of this genus are found in Southern South Hemisphere.

Species 
The following species are recognised:
 Fibulia anchorata 
 Fibulia carnosa 
 Fibulia conulissima 
 Fibulia cribriporosa 
 Fibulia hispidosa 
 Fibulia intermedia 
 Fibulia maeandrina 
 Fibulia myxillioides 
 Fibulia novaezealandiae 
 Fibulia ramosa , Columnar sponge

References

Sponges
Sponge genera
Demospongiae